The Golden Sheaf Award for best Animation production is presented by the Yorkton Film Festival.

History
In 1947 the Yorkton Film Council was founded.  The first Yorkton Film Festival was held in 1950.  During the first few festivals, the films were adjudicated by audience participation through ballot casting and winners were awarded 'Certificates of Merit' by the film council.  In 1958 the film council established the Yorkton Film Festival Golden Sheaf Award for the category 'Best of Festival', awarded to the best overall film of the festival. 

In 1973 the Golden Sheaf Award for Animation was added to the Main Categories.  The winner of this award is determined by a panel of jurors to select the best film or video that tells a story based primarily on frame by frame or computer-assisted animation techniques.  In 2020 the Golden Sheaf Award categories included the Main Entry Categories, Accompanying Categories, Craft Categories, and Special Awards.

Winners

1970s

1980s

1990s

2000s

2010s

2020s

References 

Awards established in 1973
Yorkton Film Festival awards
Canadian animation awards